Serhiy Oleksandrovych Panasenko (born 9 March 1992) is a Ukrainian professional footballer who plays as a central midfielder for the Ukrainian club Metalist Kharkiv.

Career
On 7 February 2020, Panasenko signed for Ukrainian Second League club Veres Rivne.. In summer 2022 he moved to Metalist Kharkiv.

External links

References 

1992 births
Living people
Footballers from Dnipro
Ukrainian footballers
Association football midfielders
FC Kryvbas Kryvyi Rih players
FC Dnipro-2 Dnipropetrovsk players
FC Kolos Zachepylivka players
FC Hirnyk-Sport Horishni Plavni players
FC Cherkashchyna players
FC VPK-Ahro Shevchenkivka players
FC Helios Kharkiv players
FC Inhulets Petrove players
SC Dnipro-1 players
MFC Mykolaiv players
NK Veres Rivne players
FC Metalist Kharkiv players
Ukrainian Premier League players
Ukrainian First League players
Ukrainian Second League players